Giselle Anne Ansley,  (born 31 March 1992) is an English field hockey player who plays as a defender in the Dutch Hoofdklasse for HGC and the England and Great Britain national teams.

Ansley was educated at Churston Ferrers Grammar School, Brixham, Devon.

She was appointed Member of the Order of the British Empire (MBE) in the 2017 New Year Honours for services to hockey.

Club career
Ansley plays club hockey in the Dutch Hoofdklasse for HGC. 

She previously played club hockey in the Women's England Hockey League Premier Division for Surbiton.

She has also played club hockey for Loughborough Students and Plymouth Marjon.

International career

Ansley made her international debut in 2013. She competed for England in the women's hockey tournament at the 2014 Commonwealth Games where she won a silver medal.

She competed in the 2016 Summer Olympics in Rio de Janeiro, winning a gold medal in a penalty shootout against the defending champions Netherlands.

References

External links
 

Profile on England Hockey
Profile on Great Britain Hockey

1992 births
Living people
Commonwealth Games silver medallists for England
English female field hockey players
Field hockey players at the 2014 Commonwealth Games
Alumni of Loughborough University
Loughborough Students field hockey players
People from Kingsbridge
Field hockey players at the 2016 Summer Olympics
Field hockey players at the 2020 Summer Olympics
Olympic field hockey players of Great Britain
British female field hockey players
Medalists at the 2016 Summer Olympics
Olympic gold medallists for Great Britain
Olympic medalists in field hockey
Commonwealth Games medallists in field hockey
Members of the Order of the British Empire
Female field hockey defenders
Surbiton Hockey Club players
Women's England Hockey League players
Olympic bronze medallists for Great Britain
Medalists at the 2020 Summer Olympics
People educated at Churston Ferrers Grammar School
Medallists at the 2014 Commonwealth Games